Ranya Mordanova (Russian: Раня Морданова; born Raniya Ramilevna Mordanova on July 18, 1991) is a Russian fashion model.

Career

Ranya Mordanova was born in Ufa, Bashkortostan, Russia.

She soon became one of the faces of Givenchy fall/winter 2009 campaign alongside Adriana Lima, Iris Strubegger, and Mariacarla Boscono for its advertising campaign shot by photographers Mert Alas and Marcus Piggott.

References

External links
 
 Ranya Mordanova at Models.com
 
 Ranya Mordanova at Vogue.ru

Living people
1991 births
Russian female models
People from Ufa